Lee Bryant (born 25 June 1985) is a former professional English darts player who plays in Professional Darts Corporation events.

He earned a PDC Tour Card in 2017 and qualified for the 2017 UK Open but did not get past the first round.

References

External links
Profile and stats on Darts Database

1985 births
Living people
English darts players
Sportspeople from Devon
Professional Darts Corporation former tour card holders